Bburago is an Italian brand and former manufacturing company of toys and die-cast scale model cars. The company was based in Burago di Molgora, where all products were made from 1974 to 2005. At its most popular, Bburago's main competitors were Politoys and Maisto, the latter of which was to become dominant in the 1:18 market segment around 2000.

In 2006, Hong Kong-based May Cheong Group (owner of the Maisto and Polistil brands) acquired rights to the "Bburago" brand, taking over the production and commercialization of its die-cast model vehicles, which are made in China.

Martoys 

The company was founded as "Martoys" by the Besana brothers, Ugo, Martino, and Mario, who sold their first well-known brand Mebetoys to Mattel. For this brand new line, only models in 1:24 scale were produced. In 1976, after only two years, the Besanas renamed the brand "Bburago" (with two 'B's at the beginning of the name). It is said that the change came because of possible confusion with the classic toy maker Marx Toys, where the 'X' in the logo was often not noticed, thus Marx sometimes being referred to as 'Mar Toys'.

Models 
According to the 1975 catalog, there were only nine basic models in the Martoys line-up, though most of these were offered in at least a couple of versions. These models were:  Renault Alpine (and Alpine rally), Porsche 911 (S, Carrera RS, and "Polizei"), FIAT 127 (plain, "vigili urbani", and rally), Lancia Stratos (Marlboro or Alitalia), Range Rover (plain and airport fire), Renault 5, BMW 3.0 CS, Lancia Beta, and Audi 80GT. While Mebetoys had been 1:43 scale, Martoys, however, focused on larger toys in 1:24 and 1:18 scales.

In that catalog, the Audi, BMW, Lancia Beta, Renault 5 and Range Rover were portrayed with photographs of real vehicles, not the models, so there is some doubt about whether all the proposed line was produced as Martoys, or if some were as yet under development - to be later introduced after the name change to Bburago. A FIAT 131 (plain and Carabinieri) was also apparently produced, but it was not shown in the 1975 catalog. A newsletter/flyer from David Sinclair, perhaps the earliest importer of Martoys to the United States, reported all of the above were available except the Lancia Beta (listed as available later) and the FIAT 131 (not listed at all). The 131 appears to have been the last model to reach production under the Martoys label.

Detail and rendering 

Models were attractive and well-done but this was when larger scales were just becoming (along with Polistil) popular as toys for easier rendering of details - yet before collector and consumer demand for near-perfect rendition occurred through the 1990s. So, some of the Martoys lines simply did not look right. The frames on the opening doors of the FIAT 127 were thick, unrefined and appeared toy-like. The BMW 3.0 CS simply could not capture the delicate fender curves of the real car and grille proportions were squarish. The subtle lines that defined the beauty of the real machine that Alexander Calder went on to decorate were lost on the Martoys model.

The Porsche 911 had a big amount of details, both in engine, body, lights and script and logo detail. With a little bit of trim paint, the model was stunning. Nevertheless, the Porsche's roof line and rear quarters do not appear perfectly captured.

Packaging 
Martoys boxes had two different card-box designs. The older one featured accentuated rounded graphic letters popular in the 1970s. The lettering was overlapped and staggered on top of itself four times, starting with a dark purple blue in the background and fading to lighter and lighter green on top, the 'O' in Martoys formed a three-ring red bulls eye that looked like the Target store symbol. The design was colorful and not subtle –it was more toy-like than collector-like.

The boxes featured a picture of the model and not usually the real car (in contrast to fellow Italian manufacturer Polistil's S series which had actual photos of the real automobile). Later, all models had a white box with less flamboyant graphics. As with Polistil's S-series, box designs did not have the transparent plastic window to see the real model inside that became the standard for all larger-scale toys later on. Printed on the bottom panel of the box were specifications of the real car, and if you were lucky the catalog came inside.

Later history 

A couple of years after Mebetoys was sold to Mattel, the Besana brothers made plans to form the new company. Martoys, however, never had the chance to develop a firm image for itself.  When the name was changed, none of the graphics or signage was kept. All was abandoned for the new Bburago look. Bburago's trek, even under an onslaught of larger-scale toys and collectibles has lasted since 1976, though it was finally acquired by the Asian company Maisto in 2008. A perusal of the company history and vision on the official Bburago website says nothing about Martoys, though one could say Martoys was in many ways responsible for the big trend in larger scale diecast that was to become the rage in the 1980s and 1990s.

The Gran Toros website reports that Martino Besana died around 1993.  As of 2008, Mario was suffering from cancer, but Ugo was in good health.  Ugo (now in his 80s) and his wife had founded Vivien Company making toy irons and ironing boards - products similar to those made in the early days of Mebetoys.

Bburago

Early models 

One of the earliest Bburago lines was a series of 1:43 scale Fiat trucks, but these seem to have disappeared by about 1980, according to. Continuing the Martoys lineup, however, most models were produced initially in 1/24 scale and mostly represented contemporary European sports and saloon cars. Most were well detailed, and included many opening features.

Later, a range of 1/18 vehicles was produced which was to become the "bread and butter" of Bburago offerings. In the mid-1980s, a new 1/43 scale line was begun. As they were held together by screws, models in 1/24 and 1/18 were also commonly issued in kit form (later, 1/43 kits appeared as well).

While vehicles in the kit ranges used the same castings as their contemporaries in the fully assembled ranges, the kits often depicted different versions, usually in racing or rally style. Bburago kits were notorious for featuring waterslide transfers which never adhered properly to the models, making well-built examples of the kits rare. Clearcoat could be sprayed over the unassembled model to "seal" the decals "in".

Conversely, the transfers on factory-built cars were of the 'stick on' variety, rather than the 'tampo' printing used by the likes of Maisto.

Larger scales 

Originally, the 1/18 scale range was aimed more at collectors, and Bburago was the link between European niche marketing in 1/43 scale and the 1/18 scale surge that occurred during the 1990s. Bburago was the first manufacturer to make this scale the main offering of the company, after Schuco, Gama, and Polistil pioneered larger offerings, but who by the end of the 1970s were going out of business. Bburago was also a contemporary of the mail order offerings of Franklin Mint Precision Models which were pricier, but sometimes of spotty quality.

Bburago did not, however, stick strictly to 1/18, with smaller cars like the Renault Alpine A110 and the Fiat 500 presented in 1/16 and larger vehicles like the Ford F-150 pickup in 1/21. 1/24 was also a regular size. The Ford pickup, however, is an exception as European marques were a main focus of the Italian company. At first, offerings consisted mostly of 1930s cars, but later, more 1950s and 1960s models were introduced, like the Jaguar XK-E roadster. Finally, many contemporary high-performance automobiles, like the Lamborghini Diablo, appeared and some of these were the company's most popular sellers.

For cost savings, models were often duplicated from one scale to another. The "Diamond", "Super", and "Gold" ranges were the main lines in a 1/18 scale with over 30 different models. Each vehicle would be offered in two or three colors and often in a roadster and coupe version. Differences in the ranges are hard to discern, but the Super line

was more aligned to classic cars, while the "Gold" series had more deluxe packaging.

There were also several lines in a 1/24 scale. These included the Grand Prix, Bijoux, VIP, and Super lines. The Super series included many normal coupes, sedans, and micro cars in rally and police liveries, with 45 different models. The Grand Prix line consisted of ten Formula One and Indy Cars.

The larger models usually had all apertures opening, had detailed engines, spare tires in trunks, working steering, windshield wipers and detailed instrument panels. A number of models also feature active suspension and removable wheels. Early on there was a use of plastics for door and bonnet openings. These parts sometimes hindered fit and finish, and, after extended play, would stretch or bend, causing hoods and doors to not close properly.

Bburago's 1/43 scale "Pocket" series consisted of about thirty-six offerings in about sixty separate liveries. These had simple 'Hot Wheels' inspired chrome on hard plastic tires, and no opening features, but were good value for the money.

Though oriented more to children in price (often selling for only a couple of dollars), 1/43 model detail was excellent and the presentation, like the early Saab 900 or the long lived MCA/Mega Monte Carlo model (one version with Russian MIG sponsorship), were quite attractive.

Smaller scales 
Bburago offers several models in a 1/64 scale. Most models do not have opening features.

Competition increases and closure 
By the end of the 1990s, Bburago no longer had a main corner on the 1/18 collector market, as many competitors of both high-end and low-end were now producing models. Some of these were Exoto, Maisto, Yatming, Ertl, Mira, Revell, Jouef, Chrono, Anson, and also Mattel, to name a few. Maisto became the main diecast brand in larger scales and began to eclipse most other manufacturers.

Many of these companies had an edge as their products could be produced with far cheaper labour in Thailand and China, while Bburago continued more expensive production in Italy. In October 2005, Bburago declared bankruptcy, and the receivers were called in. Many companies expressed interest in the tooling.

Fortunately, the venerable toy name of Bburago was not left to die, but was finally purchased by May Cheong (Maisto) from the bankruptcy court in 2006. This essentially marked the end of Italian mass-produced (and also one of the last European manufactured) affordable diecast vehicles.

Prior to its closure, the company was also hard hit by an exclusive promotional contract granted to Mattel for the production of model Ferraris. As much money had been invested in the tooling to produce these models, the company was adversely affected. This contract has now changed, and other diecast manufacturers (including Bburago) are again making miniatures of the prancing horse, but at the time this stretched Bburago's finances.

Scale models 1/24 (Italian production) 

AC Shelby Cobra 289
Alfa Romeo Alfetta GTV
Alfa Romeo Alfetta GTV Gr.4
Alfa Romeo Giulia
Alfa Romeo Giulietta
Alfa Romeo Stelvio
Alfa Romeo 33
Alfa Romeo 75
Alfa Romeo 156
Alpine A110 (1ª Serie)
Alpine A110 (2ª Serie)
Audi 80 Gt
Audi RS5
Audi Quattro Gt
Audi TT Coupé
Austin Metro MG Turbo
BMW 3.0 Csi
BMW 3.0 Csi Turbo
BMW 635 Csi Gr.A
BMW M1
BMW M3 E36 GTR
BMW Z3 M Roadster
BMW Z4 Roadster
BMW Z8 Roadster
Bugatti Type 55
Bugatti Type 57 Atlantic
Bugatti EB 110
Chevrolet Corvette '57
Chevrolet Corvette C5
Chevrolet Corvette C5 Convertible
Citroen 15 CV T.A.
Citroën 2 CV
Datsun 240 Z
Datsun 280 Z
Dodge Viper RT/10
Dodge Viper GTS
Dodge Viper SRT/10
DS 3
Ferrari 250 Testarossa
Ferrari 250 GTO
Ferrari 250 LM
Ferrari 275 GTB / 4
Ferrari 512 BB
Ferrari 308 GTB
Ferrari 288 GTO
Ferrari Testarossa
Ferrari F40
Ferrari 348 tb
Ferrari 456 Gt
Ferrari F50
Ferrari 550 Maranello
Fiat Nuova 500 '57
Fiat 124 Abarth Spider
Fiat 127
Fiat 131 Abarth Rally
Fiat 131 Mirafiori
Fiat Ritmo Abarth
Fiat Panda
Fiat Regata
Fiat Uno
Fiat Tipo
Fiat Cinquecento
Fiat Punto
Fiat Punto Evo
Fiat Nuova Panda
Ford Escort MkII 1.1 L
Ford Escort MkII RS 1800
Ford Capri Group 5
Ford Mustang
Ford Escort MkIII XR3i
Ford Escort MkIV RS Cosworth
Ford Focus RS
Ford Focus SW
Ford Streetka
Innocenti Mini 120
Jaguar XK 120 Coupé
Jaguar XK 120 Roadster
Jeep CJ 7
Lamborghini Cheetah
Lamborghini Countach
Lamborghini Diablo
Lamborghini Murciélago
Lancia Beta Berlina
Lancia Beta Montecarlo
Lancia Stratos
Lancia 037 Rally
Lancia Delta S4
Lancia Ypsilon
Land Rover Range Rover
Land Rover 110
Land Rover Freelander
Land Rover Range Rover '94
Lexus IS
Lotus 97T
Matra Simca Bagheera
Mazda RX 7
Mercedes Benz SSK
Mercedes Benz 300 SL '54 
Mercedes Benz 450 SEL
Mercedes Benz 450 SLC
Mercedes Benz 500 SEC
Mercedes Benz 190 E
Mini Cooper '60
Mini Cooper '01
Opel Kadett C Coupé
Opel Kadett C Gte Gr.4
Opel Ascona 400
Porsche Cayenne
Peugeot 205 T16
Peugeot 206 CC
Peugeot 207
Peugeot 405 T16
Porsche 356 B Cabriolet
Porsche 356 B Coupé
Porsche 911 S
Porsche 911 Turbo
Porsche 924 Turbo
Porsche 935 TT
Porsche 959 Turbo
Porsche 993 Coupé
Porsche 993 Cabriolet
Porsche 996 Coupé
Porsche 996 Gt3
Renault 4 L
Renault 5 L
Renault 5 Alpine
Renault 14 TL
Renault 5 Turbo Gr.4
Renault Fuego
Renault Twingo RS Gordini
Rolls-Royce Silver Shadow
Saab 900 Turbo
Schlesser Buggy Megane
Shelby Series 1
Smart Roadster
Talbot Matra Rancho
Toyota Celica Gr.5
Volkswagen Golf MkI Gti
Volkswagen Golf MkIV
Volkswagen Polo MkV GTI
Volkswagen New Beetle
Volkswagen New Beetle Cup
Volkswagen New Beetle Convertible
Volkswagen California

Rebirth 

Bburago cars, especially the early 1/24 scale models, are now collectible, and it is thought that the final models issued under the old management will also become similarly prized. Of the early cars, the rarest models are generally considered to be the Lancia Beta sedan introduced under the Martoys name, and the Innocenti Mini 120. The Lamborghini Cheetah 4x4, Renault 4L, Fiat 124 Spyder Abarth, Alfetta GTV and BMW 3.0 CSL "Batmobile" are all also now rare and valuable.

Other collectible Bburagos include some rare promo models, like examples of the Camargue finished in metallic gold green, and at least one model that was issued only in mainland Europe; the Lancia Ypsilon in 1/24. The final 1/18 car issued before the bankruptcy was the Peugeot 907 concept car. At the time the company ceased production of all its Ferrari models, a model of the Ferrari 360 Spider in 1/18 scale was about to be introduced. It is thought that a few may have left the factory in Italy (although this is not confirmed).

In the beginning of 2007, the name was relaunched by May Cheong, which markets Maisto, so the situation is analogous to Mattel owning both Hot Wheels and Matchbox.

In order for both lines to be successful, they must be differentiated in some manner and May Cheong's logical answer was to make Bburago's offerings more European. A count from the two brands' websites in 2011 confirms the two approaches. Out of 64 1/18 scale cars, Bburago only has six models that are not European, or 9%.

Maisto, with 113 total 1/18 scale models, on the other hand, has fifty-three non-European models or 47% non-European. May Cheong bets it can avoid internal competition among brands by having Maisto carry a more global selection of marques. Many of the earlier Bburago models made at the time of the May Cheong takeover are now being produced again in Thailand and China, along with new castings.

By 2011, some models, like the smaller scale "Race and Play" series of "garage" scene Ferraris, were again appearing in retail stores, such as Toys "R" Us. It appears that no models are made in Italy any longer.

Footnotes

Sources

Further reading
 Richardson, Mike; Richardson, Sue.  1999.  Christie's Presents The Magical World of Automotive Toys.  San Francisco: Chronicle Books. p. 173.

See also 

 Model car

External links

 
 History of BBurago and other model car manufacturers on Fabtintoys
 BBurago Diecast on Mdiecast
 BBurago model reviews at Diecast Zone

Italian brands
Italian companies established in 1976
Toy companies established in 1976
Model manufacturers of Italy
Die-cast toys
Toy cars and trucks